Debbie Jenkinson is an illustrator and comic artist from Dublin, Ireland, who is active in the small-press comic scene.

She is the creator of a long-form comic, Remorse a story about a young Dubliner who is trapped in a call center job. It was chosen as runner up on Comicosity's Best of 2015 by Alison Berry.

Jenkinson studied animation in the 1990s at Ballyfermot, when she read and was inspired by Art Spiegelman's Maus. After working in an animation studio in the United States, she returned to Ireland to pursue her MA at the National College of Art and Design (NCAD).

She is co-founder of The Comics Lab, a quarterly meet-up of artists in Ireland. She is a member of the artists collective Stray Lines. She also helped launch the first Graphic Short Prize which is run through The Irish Times with fellow artist Sarah Bowie.

Jenkinson speaks about the "magical triangulation" that occurs in comics, between the image, the text, and the reader. "I think our brains take in pictorial information in a different way...a more natural way. There's something really immersive about reading a comic, that's different from reading prose...It's like looking at the world through someone else's eyes."

Jenkinson is a member of Illustrators Ireland, a non-profit professional organization which advocates on behalf of illustrators in the country.

Selected works 

 Heirloom
 War Chest
 The Yellow Planet
 Remorse

References

External links 
 Interview with Debbie Jenkison about death and comics and the "hospice comic" genre, 8 December 2018

Year of birth missing (living people)
Living people
21st-century Irish women artists
Alumni of the National College of Art and Design
Artists from Dublin (city)
Irish comics artists
Irish women illustrators
Irish female comics artists